Ward Whitt (born 1942) is an American professor of operations research and management sciences. He is the Wai T. Chang Professor of Industrial Engineering and Operations Research at Columbia University. His research focuses on queueing theory, performance analysis, stochastic models of telecommunication systems, and numerical transform inversion. He is recognized for his contributions to the understanding and analyses of complex queues and queuing networks, which led to advances in the telecommunications system. As of November 2, 2015, his publications have been cited over 25,000 times, and he has an h-index of 82.

Biography
Whitt was born in Bozeman, Montana.  He received a BA in Mathematics from Dartmouth and a PhD in operations research from Cornell (1969). His doctoral thesis, Weak Convergence Theorems for Queues in Heavy Traffic, paved the path for his future research. Whitt joined the operations research faculty at Stanford before moving to Yale in 1969. From 1977–2002, he worked in Bell Labs and then AT&T Labs. Since 2002, he has been a full professor in the Department of Industrial Engineering and Operations Research (IEOR) at Columbia.

Honors
Whitt received numerous accolades for his seminal contributions to operations research. He holds a number of telecommunications-related patents. He has been on the editorial boards of major management science journals including Operations Research. He is a member of Institute for Operations Research and the Management Sciences (INFORMS) and Institute of Mathematical Statistics. He has also been a member and committee chair in the National Academy of Engineering. From 1999 to 2001, Whitt has been on the INFORMS prize committee.

Awards
2003 INFORMS Frederick W. Lanchester Prize
2002 Inaugural INFORMS Fellow
2001 John von Neumann Theory Prize
2001 Harold Larnder Prize
1997 AT&T Fellow
1996 National Academy of Engineering Member

References

External links 
 Ward Whitt page at National Academy of Engineering
 Home Page
 Department Page
 INFORMS: Biography of Ward Whitt from the Institute for Operations Research and the Managerial Sciences

1942 births
Members of the United States National Academy of Engineering
Fellows of the Institute for Operations Research and the Management Sciences
Dartmouth College alumni
Cornell University College of Engineering alumni
Columbia University faculty
Columbia School of Engineering and Applied Science faculty
Living people
Probability theorists
John von Neumann Theory Prize winners